The 1992 New Territories West by-election was held on 30 August 1992 after the incumbent Legislative Councillor Ng Ming-yum of New Territories West died of blood cancer on 22 June 1992.

It was the second by-election in the constituency since the 1991 general election. The two-time candidate, conservative rural leader Tang Siu-tong defeated Albert Ho Chun-yan, vice chairman of the liberal United Democrats of Hong Kong (UDHK), and independent Sui See-chun with 51 percent majority, receiving 33,038 votes.

Result

See also
 1991 Hong Kong legislative election
 List of Hong Kong by-elections
 1991 New Territories West by-election

References

1992 in Hong Kong
1992 elections in Asia
1992